Miroslav Iličić (born 17 April 1998) is a Croatian footballer who plays as a forward for Slovenian PrvaLiga side Gorica.

References

1998 births
Living people
Footballers from Rijeka
Association football forwards
Croatian footballers
HNK Orijent players
NK Slaven Belupo players
NK Istra 1961 players
NK Celje players
ND Gorica players
First Football League (Croatia) players
Croatian Football League players
Slovenian PrvaLiga players
Croatian expatriate footballers
Expatriate footballers in Slovenia
Croatian expatriate sportspeople in Slovenia